William Francis de Oliveira Morais (1 March 1991 – 6 February 2011) was a Brazilian footballer.

Career
Morais started in football on the youth squad of the Corinthians. With good performances in the Copa São Paulo de Juniores and the Campeonato Paulista de Juniores, the midfielder was named by coach Mano Menezes to join the core team of the Corinthians.

Morais was killed in a robbery attempt in Belo Horizonte. Police say the 19-year-old midfielder on loan to Minas Gerais's América FC was shot in the back early Sunday, 6 February 2011. He was returning home from a party when he was attacked by three robbers. Corinthians president Andres Sanchez reacted with anger to the news, calling it a "horrific crime that ended the life of a young man with a brilliant future."

Career statistics

Club

References

External links
 ogol.com

1991 births
2011 deaths
Brazilian footballers
Deaths by firearm in Brazil
Male murder victims
People murdered in Brazil
Brazilian murder victims
São Paulo FC players
Sport Club Corinthians Paulista players
Nacional Atlético Clube (SP) players
América Futebol Clube (MG) players
Footballers from São Paulo
Association football midfielders